The 2013 World Under-17 Hockey Challenge was an ice hockey tournament held in Drummondville and Victoriaville, Quebec, Canada between December 29, 2012 and January 4, 2013.  The World Under-17 Hockey Challenge is held by Hockey Canada annually to showcase young hockey talent from across Canada and other strong hockey countries.  The primary venues used for the tournament are the Centre Marcel Dionne in Drummondville and the Colisée Desjardins in Victoriaville.

Challenge results

Preliminary round

Group A

Results

Group B

Results

Final round

Semifinals

9th place game

7th place game

5th place game

Bronze medal game

Gold medal game

Scoring leaders

Goaltending leaders
(Minimum 60 minutes played)

Final standings

Tournament All-Star Team
Goaltender:  Quebec Julio Billia
Defencemen:  Nikita Lyamkin,  Adam Ollas Mattsson
Forwards:  Oskar Lindblom,  Ontario Connor McDavid,  Sonny Milano

See also
 World U-17 Hockey Challenge
 2013 IIHF World U18 Championships
 2013 World Junior Ice Hockey Championships

References

External links

World U-17 Hockey Challenge
U-17
U-17
U-17
U-17
U-17
Sport in Drummondville
Sport in Victoriaville
Ice hockey competitions in Quebec
U17
International ice hockey competitions hosted by Canada